Searching is a British television sitcom which originally aired on ITV in 1995.

Cast
 Prunella Scales as  Mrs. Tilston
 Julia St John as Chancy
 Victoria Carling as  Lena
 Clare Cathcart as  Dora 
 Regina Freedman as  Milly
 Robert Gwilym as  Daniel Carter 
 Amanda Bellamy as  Hetty
 Reginald Marsh as Chancy's dad
 Marcia Warren as Chancy's mum
 Mabel Aitken as April
 Mark Williams as Gerald
 James Nesbitt as  Duncan
 David Gooderson as Mr. Gillespie
 Jo Kendall as  Nurse

References

Bibliography
 Horace Newcomb. Encyclopedia of Television. Routledge, 2014.

External links
 

1995 British television series debuts
1995 British television series endings
1990s British sitcoms
ITV sitcoms
Carlton Television
Television series by ITV Studios
English-language television shows